Sabaces (name variants: Sabakes, Sauaces; Sataces; Sathaces; Diodorus Siculus calls him Tasiaces; Aramaic: 𐡎𐡅𐡉𐡊 SWYK, died in 333 BC) was an Achaemenid Persian satrap of the Achaemenid Thirty-first Dynasty of Egypt during the reign of king Darius III of Persia.

Resistance to Alexander the Great
Some time before the Battle of Issus (modern-day Turkey), Sabaces left Egypt with his army to join Darius III in Syria and support him in his fight against Alexander the Great. When the Battle of Issus took place (November 333 BC) Alexander and his horsemen fought their way through the enemy troops until they came in close vicinity to Darius III, whose life was therefore threatened. Darius III was protected by the most noble Persians, among them also Sabaces, who was killed:

The Persian king fled because he feared for his life; therefore the Macedonians won the battle.

Successor
Mazaces was probably the successor of Sabaces in Egypt, but because Sabaces had taken with him nearly all occupying forces, Mazaces was not able to organize military resistance against the Macedonians. Therefore, Alexander the Great was able to take Egypt without fighting (332 BC).

Notes

References 

 Waldemar Heckel: Who’s who in the age of Alexander the Great. Prosopography of Alexander’s empire. Blackwell, Oxford 2006, 
 Siegfried Lauffer: Alexander der Große. dtv, Munich 1978, third edition 1993, p. 78 and 87.

Military personnel of the Achaemenid Empire killed in action
Opponents of Alexander the Great
333 BC deaths
Year of birth unknown
4th-century BC Iranian people
Achaemenid satraps of Egypt
4th century BC in Egypt
Thirty-first Dynasty of Egypt